The ASEAN Convention Center, formerly the Fontana Convention Center, is a convention center at the Clark Freeport Zone in Pampanga, Philippines.

The building was originally constructed in February 2016 and was meant as one of the venues of one of the ministerial meetings of the 2017 ASEAN Summit.

It was renovated by Budji+Royal Architects for four months 2017 and was renamed as the ASEAN Convention Center and the venue hosted the 11th ASEAN Defense Ministers' Meeting.

Its facade was previously yellow in color prior to the 2017 renovations.

The judo, jujitsu, and kurash competitions of the 2019 Southeast Asian Games are scheduled to be held at the convention center. During the COVID-19 pandemic, the convention center was temporarily converted to a 150-bed quarantine facility.

References

Buildings and structures in Pampanga
Convention centers in the Philippines